Mit Borrás (Madrid, 1982) is a spanish visual artist based in Madrid and Berlin.

His work examines the relationship between human, nature and technology and their purpose of evolution. He has developed a work complex that encompasses visions of a post-human state of consciousness. Its center of focus is based on the interconnectivity between biodiversity and technological progress and the philosophical concept of adaptation as a method of surpassing categorial limits of existence. His work are essayistic portraits in the form of video-based works, performances and multi-dimensional installations, embody an augmented state of awareness.

The work of Mit Borrás has been exhibited at Centre Pompidou, Paris (2022), Art Dubai, UAE (2022),  the Hara Museum, Tokyo (2010), Exgirlfriend Gallery, Berlin (2016–21), Tick Tack Gallery, Antwerp (2021), The Wrong Bienale, Paris (2021), Art Cologne (2021), Pylon Hub, Dresden (2021), Harddiskmuseum, Paris (2020), Arebyte Gallery, London (2019), Towards the Last Unicorn, Sau Paulo (2019), Dimora Artica, Milan (2018), Frontviews, Vienna (2019) Berlin (2018) and Athens (2018), Aleph Projects, Tel Aviv (2017),Biennial of Media Arts of Chile (2017), Palacio Fernandini and Art Lima, Lima (2016), Museo de Bellas Artes de Chile (2017), Kreuzberg Pavillon, Berlin (2013) and Norway (2016), Loop Barcelona (2010,15-19 ), Transmediale, Berlin (2011) among others.

He has directed the production of digital art festivals, carried out numerous projects as an independent curator, co-directed Fünf Galerie in Berlin (2010–14) and worked as coordinator of cultural projects at the Instituto Cervantes in Germany ( 2014).
Borrás teaches Video Art, New Media Art and Communication in the Circulo de Bellas Artes Escuela Sur, is the director of the studio CAVVE Pavilion, His work is represented in Germany by Exgirlfriend gallery and in Spain by House of Chappaz gallery and is member of the art collective Frontviews and Haunt center in Berlin.

Work 

Mit Borrás has developed a work complex that encompasses visions of a post-human state of consciousness. Its center of focus is based on the interconnectivity between nature and technology and the philosophical concept of adaptation as a method of surpassing categorial limits of existence.

Adaptasi Cycle is a divination of our reality, transcending limits of past and futures, synthetic and organic or nature and technology. Essayistic portraits in the form of digital art, video-based works, performances and multi-dimensional installations, embody an augmented state of awareness of these aspects and operate as individual suites of this opus of Borrás. Visual artist Rachel Lamot is the art director and co-writer for Adaptasi Cycle and Daniel Vacas Peralta has composed the music for it.

His body of work has an holistic approach to the wellbeing and balance of body and mind, aiming at the conjunction between the inner and outer world, as a form of healing. Rites are a central and recurring theme of Adaptasi Cycle, as the epitome of mental immersion through physical acts and exercises. Through meditation, (kemetic) yoga, and conscious workout, the characters in Borrás’ work seem to perpetuate the connection of their soul to a higher and immortal realm of existence.

Equally, Borrás’ work addresses the paradox of our accelerationistic culture: an intrinsic predisposition to fear death, yet idealizing (technological) progress, when in fact progress applied to the human body as the vessel of our existence, ultimately means decay. Subsequently, there is an urge for strategies to overcome this fear and to learn how to deal with the dismal reality of the inescapable decomposition inherent in nature, as a form of healing.

The work complex of Borras encompasses a visual dichotomy of wild, untamed, evanescent nature on the one hand, and man-made, contained culture, such as technology on the other hand.

In his video work Heavven from Adaptasi Cycle, scenes of an isolated and highly focused protagonist, watched and followed by his AI robotic companion, alternate with sequences of nature's micro- and macrocosm. Aerial views of glaciers, snowed mountains and dense forests are followed by animated mushrooms, representative of a higher level of holistic connection, as the fungi are only the fruit of their mycorrhizal network - the so-called mushroom network, which connects bigger plants like trees through tiny threads of the mycelium. With this in mind, Borrás’ work is equivalent to the picture of the tip of the iceberg, as if a subtle glimpse into a highly complex universe, the visualized essence of our reality's noise and its underlying entanglement of every element and ultimately its sublimation.

His visual language facilitates the dialogue between nature and culture, or more precisely the organic and the synthetic. From time to time, elements of both worlds wander in their natural composition in the respective other realm. Sometimes they appear as a surrogate of their original template, reminiscing its absence as a form of eternalizing its soul and to sustain its metaphysical connection. However, the dichotomy of both worlds is not strictly excluding of their counterpart. In the duality of this scenario, Borrás locates what can be identified as human nature in highly stylized interior spaces, which exemplify the opposite, the synthetic, at a first brief glance. At a second glance, we notice that the appearing characters have already undergone an evolution, morphing into their post-human existence, being bionic examples of technology merging with the human flesh. Through their adaptation, these humanoid personae embody the rites of passage of future human existence possibly evolving in a hyper technologized world.

In Adaptasi Cycle depictions of vast natural landscapes clash with the intimacy of distinct architectural, futuristic interior spaces of absent or minimalist decor inhabited by the protagonists. The space seems sterile, but can be read as a metaphor of the womb as a safe space of infinite harmony – a space not only protected from exterior chaos but that even doubts the existence of any kind of chaos at all. Like its inhabitant, the space conveys a sense of other-worldly, idiosyncratic beauty, foreseen in the lifestyle tendencies of Zeitgeist but that exists without any of the capitalistic drama.

The characters in Borrás’ works are often surrounded by an eerie beauty and perform in oscillating states of physical extroversion and deep introspection, making them seem both alive and lifeless alike. As benevolent ghosts - being both present and absent at the same time, completely at peace with their existence and determination, they roam space and time in a knowing, elegant manner. In their limbo, they become the embodied manifestations of Borrás’ dystopian vision and prototype of future human existence, that has evolved through bio-technological progress by breaching with its physical limitations and conventional pruderies but nevertheless incorporating ancient methodologies of the spiritual world.

Symbols of mystical quality and shamanism are interweaved with elements of modern vapor-wave and techno-futuristic aesthetics, creating an extremely distinct visual and stylistic language, that makes Borrás’ work a manifest of post-humanistic discourse in a dystopian era. The distinct and consequent aesthetic determination of his work might seem intimidatingly cathartic at times, but in actuality, it stems from a vision and pure desire for serenity, clarity, and innocence within his post-human, transitory realm. 
Borrás creates a universe that invokes the ancient and the futuristic simultaneously, addressing transience and sublimation as omnipresent phenomena, yet never disclaiming the eudaemonic alignment of its inhabitants.

Text by Julia Schmelzer. Pylon Hub. About the work of Mit Borrás. Excerpt from the text Eudaemonic Rites of Passage for the Catalogue Heavven | Mit Borrás by Exgirlfriend Gallery. Berlin, 2021.

Conferences 

2022 Future is an Animal. Instituto Europeo Di Desgin. Madrid, Spain

2022 Videoart. Professor. Escuela Sur. Madrid, Spain

2021 New Spaces for Digital Art. Fundación Telefónica. Madrid, Spain

2020 New Media and Communication in Art. Professor. Escuela Sur. Madrid, Spain

2020 Comunication I. Master. Professor. Escuela Sur. Madrid, Spain

2019 New Media and Communication in Art. Professor. Escuela Sur. Madrid, Spain

2017 There is Nothing Like The Future. LetArt. Madrid, Spain

2017 Deer Shit. The Soft Slave Wonder. Validadero. Bogotá, Colombia

2017 Ergonomic Technology. Medialab-Prado. Madrid, Spain

2016 Proyector, Videoart Festival. Belmond Monaterio. Cusco, Perú

2016 Politics Poetics. ICPNA Cusco, Perú

2015 Teaching New Media Art and Creativity. Madrid, Spain

2015 Resist Restart. Vesselroom project. Berlín, Germany

2014 Structure of the idea. Forum. Berlín, Germany

2012 Didactics of contemporary art in youth. BAMF Schule. Berlín, Germany

2009 Experimenta club. La casa encendida. Madrid, Spain

2009 Art scene in Madrid. Documentary. Globe Trekker, International

2008 Process in media art. Apple store. London, England

Press articles

English 
Interview at Nasty magazine

Pylon Hub. Article. Heavven

Artviewer. Mit Borrás at Exgirlfriend

Swarmmag. Mit Borrás

Gallery Talk. Berlin Gallery Weekend Best Exhibitions

Kuba Paris. Heavven. Mit Borrás

Scandale Projects. Mit Borrás

Kuba Paris. Phantom Limb. Mit Borrás

Interview at Tique Art

Vvovva. Mit Borrás

Kaltblut

Pylon Hub. Adaptation Cloud. Mit Borrás

Spanish 
Entrevista en Neo2. Heavven.

Entrevista en Metal Magazine

Phantom Limb. Entrevista en Neo2

Teen Wave en Neo2

Youth Cloud

Aleph Projects

Transmediale               

Mmmad

References

External links
 https://mitborras.com/
 https://www.instagram.com/mitborras/
 https://vimeo.com/funfgalerie

1982 births
People from Madrid
Spanish contemporary artists
Living people
Conceptual artists